Temuka was a parliamentary electorate in the Canterbury region of New Zealand from 1911 to 1946. The electorate was represented by four Members of Parliament.

Population centres
In the 1911 electoral redistribution, the North Island gained a further seat from the South Island due to faster population growth. In addition, there were substantial population movements within each island, and significant changes resulted from this. Only four electorates were unaltered, five electorates were abolished, one former electorate was re-established, and four electorates, including Temuka, were created for the first time.

Through the 1911 electoral redistribution, the  electorate was abolished, and its area split between the new Temuka electorate and an enlarged  electorate. Initially, the Temuka electorate included the settlements of Temuka, Pleasant Point, Fairlie, Lake Tekapo, Mount Cook, and Twizel.

In the 1918 electoral redistribution, the Temuka electorate moved north and gained the town of Geraldine. In the 1922 electoral redistribution, the Temuka electorate moved slightly south with losing or gaining significant settlements.

In the 1927 electoral redistribution, the Temuka electorate moved significantly to the north, and Fairlie, Lake Tekapo, Twizel, and Mount Cook were lost, and Mt Somers was gained. Boundary changes through the 1937 electoral redistribution were minimal, with some area near the town of Temuka gained from the  electorate. In the 1946 electoral redistribution, the Temuka electorate was abolished, with most of its area going to the Ashburton electorate, and the balance, including the town of Temuka, going to the  electorate.

History
The first representative was Thomas Buxton of the Liberal Party, who had previously represented  and who retired at the end of the term in 1914. Burnett represented Temuka until his death in 1941.

The electorate was abolished in 1946, and Acland was defeated standing for the Timaru electorate.

Members of Parliament
The electorate was represented by four Members of Parliament.

Key

Election results

1942 by-election

1938 election

1935 election

1931 election

1928 election

1925 election

1922 election

 
 
 
 
 

 

Table footnotes:

1919 election

Notes

References

Historical electorates of New Zealand
1911 establishments in New Zealand
1946 disestablishments in New Zealand